Nieścier Sakałoŭski (9 November 1902 – 13 November 1950), or Nestor Sokolovsky, was a Soviet composer.

Career
Sakałoŭski composed the music for the Byelorussian SSR's regional anthem, which is used today in the national anthem of Belarus.

References 

1902 births
1950 deaths
People from Dokshytsy District
People from Borisovsky Uyezd
National anthem writers
Soviet composers